Winchester is an unincorporated community in eastern Clark County, in the U.S. state of Missouri.

The community is located on Missouri Route H 1.5 miles west of US Route 61. Wayland is approximately five miles to the north and the community of Antioch is four miles to the west.

History
Winchester was platted in 1837, and most likely was named after Winchester, Virginia.  A post office called Winchester was established in 1840, and remained in operation until 1905.

References

Unincorporated communities in Clark County, Missouri
Unincorporated communities in Missouri